The 1977 New Zealand rugby union tour of Italy and France was a series of nine matches played by the New Zealand national rugby union team (the All Blacks) in Italy and France in October and November 1977. The All Blacks won eight of their nine games, losing only the first of the two internationals against France.

Matches
Scores and results list New Zealand's points tally first.

Touring party

Manager: Ron Don
Assistant manager: Jack Gleeson
Captain: Graham Mourie

Backs
Bevan Wilson (Otago)
Bryan Williams (Auckland)
Brian Ford (Marlborough)
Bruce Robertson (Counties)
Stu Wilson (Wellington)
Mark Taylor (Bay of Plenty)
Bill Osborne (Wanganui)
Brian Hegarty (Wellington) replacement during tour
Doug Bruce (Canterbury)
Brian McKechnie (Southland)
Mark Donaldson (Manawatu)
Kevin Greene (Waikato)

Forwards
Graham Mourie (Taranaki)
Kevin Eveleigh (Manawatu)
Lawrie Knight (Poverty Bay)
Gary Seear (Otago)
Dick Myers (Waikato)
Robbie Stuart (Hawke's Bay)
Frank Oliver (Southland)
Andy Haden (Auckland)
Gary Knight (Manawatu)
Brad Johnstone (Auckland)
John Ashworth (Canterbury)
John McEldowney (Taranaki)
Andy Dalton (Counties)
John Black (Canterbury)

References

1977
1977 rugby union tours
1977 in New Zealand rugby union
1977–78 in European rugby union
1977–78 in French rugby union
1977–78 in Italian rugby union
1977
1977